Stephen Campbell Mullighan is an Australian politician representing the South Australian House of Assembly seat of Lee for the South Australian Branch of the Australian Labor Party since the 2014 state election. He has served as the Treasurer of South Australia in the Malinauskas government since 2022.

Political career
Mullighan served as Minister for Transport and Infrastructure and Minister for Housing and Urban Development in the Weatherill Labor cabinet.

He previously held the portfolios of Minister assisting the Minister for Planning and Minister assisting the Minister for Housing and Urban Development. Mullighan entered cabinet in March 2014 and remained there until the March 2018 election when his party lost office. He has held ministerial portfolio with responsibility for transport and infrastructure, and for housing and urban development.

He is aligned with the Labor Right faction.

References

External links

Parliamentary Profile: SA Labor website
 

Members of the South Australian House of Assembly
 Labor Right politicians
Living people
21st-century Australian politicians
University of Adelaide alumni
Year of birth missing (living people)